Theprisa is a genus of beetles in the family Carabidae, containing the following species:

 Theprisa australis (Castelnau, 1867)
 Theprisa convexa (Sloane, 1920)
Theprisa darlingtoni Liebherr & Porch, 2021
 Theprisa montana Castelnau, 1867
Theprisa otway Liebherr, Porch & Maddison, 2021

References

Psydrinae